The Public Interest Law Center, founded in 1969, is a nonprofit law firm based in Philadelphia. The Public Interest Law Center works primarily in the greater Philadelphia region occasionally taking on issues on a national scale.

The Public Interest Law Center's project areas include Education, Voting, Employment, Environmental justice, Healthcare, Housing and Community Services and Voting.

History 
Founded by Edwin D. (Ned) Wolf, The Public Interest Law Center's history dates back to 1969, rooted in the Philadelphia chapter that was one of seven local affiliates of the Lawyers' Committee for Civil Rights Under Law. In its early years, the Public Interest Law Center's initial mission was to dismantle specific aspects of institutional racism by targeting discriminatory policies and practices.

Project Areas 
The Public Interest Law Centers aims to use high-impact legal strategies to both promote and protect the marginalized through project areas including Education, Voting, Employment, Environmental Justice, Healthcare, Housing and Community Services and voting.

A full list of The Public Interest Law Center's litigation can be found on the organization's website.

Notable former associates 
 Gilbert F. Casellas, former board member — Chairman of OMNITRU
 Thomas Gilhool, former staff attorney — Former Pennsylvania Secretary of Education
 Jordan Konell, former intern — 2015 Rhodes Scholar

Thaddeus Stevens Awardees 
The Public Interest Law Center annually presents the Thaddeus Stevens Award to either individuals or organizations whose actions best correspond with its social mission.
 2000: William T. Coleman, Jr
 2010: Governor Ed Rendell; Hon. Doris Smith-Ribner; Sec. Donna Cooper
 2011: Jerome Balter
 2012: Dechert LLP
 2013: DLA Piper LLP; Thomas B. Schmidt III
 2014: Pennsylvania State Conference of NAACP Branches; William H. Ewing; Kessler Topaz Meltzer & Check, LLP
 2015: School Funding Lawsuit Clients; H. Laddie Montague, Jr.

Awards 
 1978: The Delaware Valley Council on Services for the Handicapped's Annual Award for Outstanding Service to the Handicapped Community
 1997: Citizen's Committee on Public Education in Philadelphia's John N. Patterson Award for Excellence in Education
 1997: The Barristers' Association of Philadelphia's Cecil B. Moore Community Service Award
 1999: National Down Syndrome Congress' Education Award
 1999: The Michigan Academy of Pediatrics' Special Recognition Award
 2009: Inglis Award for Continuing Excellence
 2006: Society for Developmental and Behavioral Pediatrics' Special Recognition Award
 2012: Pennsylvania Budget and Policy Center's Be The Change Award for Extraordinary Work Protecting Pennsylvanians' Right to Vote
 2015: The Barristers' Association of Philadelphia's Martin Luther King, Jr. Award for Outstanding Service to the Community
 2015: NAACP's Juanita Jackson Mitchell Award

References

External links
Official Site
Grounded in Philly

Law firms based in Philadelphia
Organizations established in 1969